Marius Rusu (born 22 February 1990) is a Romanian footballer.

External links

References

Sportspeople from Constanța
1990 births
Living people
Romanian footballers
Association football defenders
Liga I players
Liga II players
FC Viitorul Constanța players
CSM Ceahlăul Piatra Neamț players
FCV Farul Constanța players